

Geometric modeling is a branch of applied mathematics and computational geometry that studies methods and algorithms for the mathematical description of shapes.
The shapes studied in geometric modeling are mostly two- or three-dimensional (solid figures), although many of its tools and principles can be applied to sets of any finite dimension.  Today most geometric modeling is done with computers and for computer-based applications. Two-dimensional models are important in computer typography and technical drawing. Three-dimensional models are central to computer-aided design and manufacturing (CAD/CAM), and widely used in many applied technical fields such as  civil and mechanical engineering, architecture, geology and medical image processing.

Geometric models are usually distinguished from procedural and object-oriented models, which define the shape implicitly by an opaque algorithm that generates its appearance.  They are also contrasted with digital images and volumetric models which represent the shape as a subset of a fine regular partition of space; and with fractal models that give an infinitely recursive definition of the shape.   However, these distinctions are often blurred: for instance, a digital image can be interpreted as a collection of colored squares; and geometric shapes such as circles are defined by implicit mathematical equations.  Also, a fractal model yields a parametric or implicit model when its recursive definition is truncated to a finite depth.

Notable awards of the area are the John A. Gregory Memorial Award and the Bézier award.

See also
 2D geometric modeling
 Architectural geometry
 Computational conformal geometry
 Computational topology
 Computer-aided engineering
 Computer-aided manufacturing
 Digital geometry
 Geometric modeling kernel
 List of interactive geometry software
 Parametric equation
 Parametric surface
 Solid modeling
 Space partitioning

References

Further reading
General textbooks:
  This book is out of print and freely available from the author.
 
 
 
 
For multi-resolution (multiple level of detail) geometric modeling :
 
 
Subdivision methods (such as subdivision surfaces):

External links
 Geometry and Algorithms for CAD  (Lecture Note, TU Darmstadt)

Geometric algorithms
Computer-aided design
Applied geometry